Pediculus humanus is a species of louse that infects humans. It comprises two subspecies:
Pediculus humanus humanus Linnaeus, 1758 – body louse
Pediculus humanus capitis De Geer, 1767 – head louse

References

External links

Lice
Insects described in 1758
Parasitic arthropods of humans
Taxa named by Carl Linnaeus